Qalat Sukar Sport Club, is an Iraqi football team based in Qalat Sukkar, Dhi Qar, that plays in Iraq Division One.

Managerial history
  Rasheed Sayer

See also 
 2021–22 Iraq FA Cup

References

External links
 Qalat Sukar SC on Goalzz.com
 Iraq Clubs- Foundation Dates

1969 establishments in Iraq
Association football clubs established in 1969
Football clubs in Dhi Qar